{{Infobox television
| image                = Bachelor_in_Paradise_logo.png
| caption              = 
| genre                = Reality competition
| creator              = 
| developer            = 
| presenter            = Chris HarrisonGuest hostsJesse Palmer
| narrated             = 
| opentheme            = "Almost Paradise" by Mike Reno and Ann Wilson
| endtheme             = 
| country              = United States
| language             = English
| num_seasons          = 8
| num_episodes         = 90
| list_episodes        = List of Bachelor in Paradise (American TV series) episodes
| executive_producer   = Mike FleissMartin HiltonNicole WoodsElan Gale Tim Warner
| location             = Mexico
| camera               = 
| runtime              = 120 minutes 60 minutes 
| company              = Next EntertainmentWarner Horizon Unscripted Television
| network              = ABC
| picture_format       = HDTV 720p
| first_aired          = 
| last_aired           = present
| related              = The BachelorThe BacheloretteBachelor Pad{{nowrap|Bachelor in Paradise: After ParadiseThe Bachelor Winter Games }}
}}Bachelor in Paradise is an American elimination-style reality competition television series, which premiered on August 4, 2014, on ABC. It is a spin-off of the American reality television shows The Bachelor and The Bachelorette. The show features previous contestants who have been featured on The Bachelor and The Bachelorette as they travel to a secluded paradise in Mexico where the show will take place. The show was originally hosted by Chris Harrison.

Production

Development and filming
In March 2013, ABC canceled Bachelor Pad after three seasons. Very similar to Bachelor Pad, rejected contestants from The Bachelor and The Bachelorette are isolated in a romantic paradise in an exotic tropical destination. The first season was filmed in Tulum, Mexico. Beginning in season 2, the show has been filmed in Sayulita, Mexico at Playa Escondida.

The show begins with an uneven number of women and men, with there being more women. At the first rose ceremony, the men are given a rose to hand out to a woman they’d like to spend more time getting to know in paradise. The women left without roses are immediately sent home. New men are then brought to the beach, so at the next rose ceremony, women can give a rose to a man they'd like to spend more time with and the remaining men are sent home. For seven weeks, this set up alternates between new men or new women joining the cast.

ABC renewed Bachelor in Paradise for a sixth season on February 5, 2019. On August 5, 2019, the series was renewed for a seventh season, which aired on August 16, 2021. In June 2021, it was confirmed that Lil Jon, Tituss Burgess, Lance Bass and others would serve as rotating guest hosts for the seventh season, replacing original host Chris Harrison. On April 7, 2022, ABC renewed Bachelor in Paradise for its eighth season, with Jesse Palmer as host, which premiered on September 27, 2022.

Misconduct allegations

During initial filming of season 4, production was halted due to allegations of sexual misconduct between two contestants—DeMario Jackson and Corinne Olympios.  After an internal investigation, it was determined that there was no misconduct and filming resumed shortly after.

After Paradise
Beginning in 2015, ABC began airing Bachelor in Paradise: After Paradise, a regular weekly live after show. Chris Harrison and Jenny Mollen co-hosted the show starring a celebrity fan and one of the Bachelor in Paradise cast members. Season 2 saw the introduction of comedian and talk show host Michelle Collins, who co-hosted After Paradise alongside Bachelor season 17 star Sean Lowe.

Season summary

Ratings

International versionsBachelor in Paradise Australia was commissioned by Network Ten in late 2017. In Germany premiered on May 9, 2018 on RTL. Bachelor in Paradise Canada premiered on October 10, 2021 on CityTV.

See also
 Ex on the Beach Paradise Hotel''

Notes

References

External links 
 
 

2010s American reality television series
2020s American reality television series
2014 American television series debuts
American Broadcasting Company original programming
American dating and relationship reality television series
American television spin-offs
English-language television shows
Reality television spin-offs
Television series by Warner Horizon Television
Paradise
Television shows set in New Mexico